Robert Arthur Allison (born December 3, 1937) is a former American professional stock car racing driver and owner. Allison was the founder of the Alabama Gang, a group of drivers based in Hueytown, Alabama, where there were abundant short tracks with high purses. Allison raced competitively in the NASCAR Cup Series from 1961 to 1988, while regularly competing in short track events throughout his career. He also raced in IndyCar, Trans-Am, and Can-Am. Named one of NASCAR's 50 greatest drivers and a member of the NASCAR Hall of Fame, he was the 1983 Winston Cup champion and won the Daytona 500 in 1978, 1982, and 1988.

His brother Donnie Allison was also a prominent driver, as were his two late sons, Clifford and Davey Allison. Bobby and Donnie's televised fistfight with Cale Yarborough at the 1979 Daytona 500 has been credited with exposing NASCAR to a nationwide audience. Allison was unusual for competing successfully with his own, low-budget team for much of his career.

Early life

Allison was born December 3, 1937, in Miami, Florida. He entered his first race as a senior at Archbishop Curley-Notre Dame High School in Miami. Since he was only 17, he had to have his parents' permission. When his mother approved, Allison assumed it was permanent, but she thought it was for only one race. After he graduated from high school in 1955, Allison's mother thought she would derail his racing interest by sending him to Wisconsin to work for Mercury Outboard Motors, where her brother-in-law, Jimmy Hallett, was the national sales manager. Unbeknownst to her, the owner of Mercury was Carl Kiekhaefer, who also owned race cars. Allison ended up working as a mechanic and an engine tester. While employed at Mercury, Allison worked in the boat division for 10 months, then was transferred to the racing division. During the two months he worked in the racing division for Kiekhaefer, he went to 19 races, mostly Grand National (Known as the NASCAR Cup Series as of 2020), and a few Convertible races. Every one of those races was won by a Carl Kiekhaefer car from the shop in which he worked. Kiekhaefer was a hard person to work for and several people got fired, so Allison decided to go back to Miami only after a little over two months.

In 1956, having returned to Miami, Allison started his own racing again. His parents said he couldn't race and live at home, so Allison came up with a fictitious name (Bob Sunderman) which was used only once as he finished well enough to make the Sunday paper. Allison's father saw the paper and told him that if he was going to race to do it with honor and use his own name. In 1959, Allison took his brother, Donnie, Kenny Andrews, who owned a car (whose father owned Andy Racing Wheels), and Gil Hearne, who went along as Kenny's driver, on a quest for more lucrative racing than was available in South Florida. Their searching led them to Montgomery Motor Speedway in Montgomery, Alabama, where he was told of a race that very night in Midfield, Alabama, near Birmingham. Allison entered and finished 5th in that race, which paid more than finishing second in any big race in South Florida. He went to Montgomery the next night, won the preliminary races, and finished 2nd in the feature, winning $400, having found his lucrative racing. The brothers returned home and Bobby talked his friend Red Farmer into coming back to Alabama with him. They had immediate success and soon they began answering to the name The Alabama Gang. Allison became a known driver and a top star in short-track racing, earning back-to-back Modified Special titles in 1962–63, then two consecutive NASCAR National Modified championships in 1964–65.

NASCAR career

Allison moved full-time to the Grand National circuit in 1965 and got his first victory at Oxford Plains Speedway on July 12, 1966.

During the course of his career, Bobby Allison accumulated 84 credited victories and 2 uncredited victories making him fourth all-time, tied with Darrell Waltrip. He also won the Daytona 500 in 1978, 1982 and 1988, finishing one-two with his son, Davey Allison.  In 1972 he was voted national Driver of the Year after winning ten races and taking 11 poles, including a record five straight. He was NASCAR Winston Cup Champion in 1983, winning the Driver of the Year award again while driving for DiGard Racing. The 1982 Daytona 500 was fraught with controversy that became known as "Bumpergate". He also won the Firecracker 400 in 1982, making Allison the fourth driver to sweep both Sprint Cup point races at Daytona in the same year. After Allison accomplished this, no driver repeated such a feat until Jimmie Johnson did it in 2013.

Allison ran in the Indianapolis 500 twice, with a best finish of 25th in 1975. His NASCAR team owners included DiGard, Junior Johnson & Associates, and Roger Penske, for whom Allison scored four of the five NASCAR wins for American Motors' Matador.  The other AMC victory was accomplished by Mark Donohue also racing for Penske in 1973 at Riverside. He raced in NASCAR as a driver/owner of an AMC Matador.

Bobby Allison was elected to the International Motorsports Hall of Fame in 1993.
Allison was involved in an accident at Talladega in May 1987, that saw his car cut down a tire, turn sideways and go airborne into the protective catch fence that separates the speedway from the grandstands. Parts and pieces of the car went flying into the grandstand injuring several spectators.
NASCAR then mandated smaller carburetors for the remaining 1987 events at Talladega and Daytona. The following year, NASCAR mandated restrictor plates at Daytona and Talladega to keep speeds under .

Allison won the first Daytona 500 run with restrictor plates in February 1988 by a car length over his son Davey Allison, rendering him the first driver to have won the Daytona 500 both with and without restrictor plates. He is the oldest driver (50 years) ever to win the Daytona 500. Bobby and Davey Allison are the first one-two father/son finish in the Daytona 500. As a result of permanent injuries in a crash at Pocono (see below), Bobby now has no memory of the final win of his career or of celebrating together with his son in victory lane. He was elected to the NASCAR Hall of Fame in 2011.

Cale Yarborough fight
Early in the 1979 Daytona 500, Bobby, his brother Donnie and rival Cale Yarborough tangled early in the race. Donnie led the second half of the race while Yarborough made up his lost laps through caution periods. By the time there were eight laps to go, Yarborough reached second place and set his eyes on passing Donnie. Bobby was two laps down and was 1/4 mile ahead of the two rivals as Yarborough and Donnie crashed on the final lap. Richard Petty went by and won the race. Bobby passed the wreckage, finished the race, and on his way back around Bobby stopped to check on his brother and make sure he wasn't hurt. He pulled over to the wreck site to offer Donnie a ride to the garage area. Yarborough ran up to Bobby and, according to Bobby, Yarborough was yelling that Bobby was at fault and hit him in the face with his helmet—cutting his nose and his lip. Bobby climbed out and a fist-fight broke out.

This fight led to a $6,000 fine each for Yarborough and the Allison brothers. In 2000 when asked about the fist-fight Bobby said "I stopped to offer Donnie a ride to the garages and Cale comes running up saying I caused the wreck. I tried to tell him he had the wrong person. And I've said before, I think I questioned his ancestry. He hit me in the face with his helmet and I saw blood dripping onto my shirt. I thought 'If I don't stop this I'll be running from Cale for the rest of my life.' I climbed out and throttled him. He ran his nose into my fist several times. My story and I'm sticking to it forever. He never challenged me again. The fine surprised me, but the fact that it brought NASCAR onto the map makes it all worth every penny." To this day, Allison maintains that Yarborough was "beating his face on my fist".

Donnie had a similar story to Bobby: "Cale said I forced him in the mud. I did not. He wrecked himself and I was the unfortunate bystander to be in it. He and I have talked. We're fine. We both view it as lost opportunities. After he and I talked it out and agreed to disagree Bobby came to the crash site asking me if I wanted a ride. Somehow I don't remember...but seconds later fists were thrown between Cale and Bobby. I tried to get into the fight and got scratched in the cheek by Cale. I later kicked him when Bobby mopped him into the mud. All of us were fined $6,000 but between Daytona 500 and this fight, today it's worth every penny to be involved in a fight that got NASCAR on the map."

Cale Yarborough unsurprisingly has a different account of the story: "If they look at the video they'll realize I was forced in the mud by Donnie. I was going to pass Donnie and win the race but he forced me in the mud and I had no control. So hell I hit him back. If I wouldn't finish the race neither would he. He and I had a civil talk after the wreck and we were fine until Bobby Allison climbed out of the car and began shouting at me. It went chaotic from there."

According to the three during an interview in 2012 at the NASCAR Hall of Fame, NASCAR later refunded the fines as a reward to them for bringing NASCAR into national spotlights. Allison however complains to this day that because he only made $4,000 in the race, he had his wife Judy help pay the fine (by contributing $2,000) & he was only refunded with $4,000 by officials.

Pocono and tragedies

On June 19, 1988, at the midpoint of the 1988 season, Allison crashed on lap 1 of the Miller High Life 500. Initially he survived a head-on hit into the outside barrier but then suddenly Jocko Maggiacomo t-boned Allison in the driver's side of the car, nearly killing Allison. When he reached a local hospital he was initially declared dead, but subsequent medical assistance saved his life.  Beginning from a vegetative state, Allison entered a rehab program. After regaining most of his memory and re-learning every day activities, Allison prepared to attempt a comeback in the early-1990's. However, a series of tragedies led Allison to abort his comeback attempt, thus retiring from driving in NASCAR.

In 1992 his younger son, Clifford Allison, was fatally injured in a practice crash for the NASCAR Busch Series race (now Xfinity Series) at Michigan International Speedway.

Later in 1993, his son Davey was killed in a helicopter accident at Talladega Superspeedway. Three years after these major tragedies, he and his wife Judy divorced. Four years after their divorce, while attending their daughter-in-law's wedding, they reconnected. They were remarried in July 2000 and remained together until her death in 2015. He was inducted into the Motorsports Hall of Fame of America in 1992, and inducted into the NASCAR Hall of Fame in May 2011, along with Lee Petty, Bud Moore, David Pearson, and Ned Jarrett.

Allison is one of nine drivers to have won what was then considered a career Grand Slam (an unofficial term) by winning the sport's four majors: the Daytona 500, the Winston 500, the Coca-Cola 600, and the Southern 500. Only eight other drivers have accomplished this feat: Richard Petty, David Pearson, Darrell Waltrip, Dale Earnhardt, Jeff Gordon, Jimmie Johnson, Buddy Baker, and Kevin Harvick.

Career wins controversy
Officially, Allison has won 84 Cup Series races, placing him in fourth place on the all-time wins list, tied with Darrell Waltrip. Unofficially, Allison has won 85 races, and may be credited with 86 wins. The controversy lies in two races: the 1971 Myers Brothers 250 held at Bowman Gray Stadium (Winston-Salem, North Carolina), and the 1973 National 500 at Charlotte Motor Speedway. (Charlotte, North Carolina.)

1971 Myers Brothers 250
Due to reduced sponsorship money being given out by the "Big Three" automobile companies in Detroit, some Winston Cup teams chose not to enter some of the smaller prize-money races of the large 48-event season (only 14 cars entered the 1971 Space City 300), leading NASCAR to allow its "minor league" Grand American Series drivers (itself suffering from a massive decrease in events versus its 1970 season) to enter six of the Winston Cup races. For these races, Grand American Series "pony cars", such as the Chevrolet Camaro, Ford Mustang, and AMC Javelin, were competing against the larger Grand National Series cars, featuring the Chevrolet Chevelle, Ford Torino Talladega, Dodge Charger Daytona, and Plymouth Roadrunner Superbird.

The 1971 Myers Brothers 250 was held August 6, 1971 at Bowman Gray Stadium in Winston-Salem, North Carolina. The first car to cross the finish line after 250 laps was driven by Allison.  Knowing that the pony car would handle better on the flat track of that race, and the race following at West Virginia International Speedway, Allison had chosen to race his Grand American 1970 Ford Mustang, No. 49, sponsored by Rollins Leasing, and owned by Melvin Joseph. (Joseph was the head of Dover International Speedway until his death in 2005.) As he was not racing in a Grand National car, he never received credit in that series, but was credited with a Grand American Series win.

NASCAR has had co-sanctioned races with various series in the past;  in such cases, the win counts only in the series which that driver's car was sanctioned. The driver tied with Allison in all-time Cup wins because of the dispute is involved in this incident. An Automobile Racing Club of America/Winston West combination race in College Station, Texas on March 21, 1993, was won by Darrell Waltrip, driving an ARCA entry. That win was credited as an ARCA win only, and not counted in the NASCAR K&N Pro Series West (as it is currently known) win list. Likewise, when a Winston Cup driver won a Winston Cup/Winston West combination race, the win counts in Cup, not West. The Busch Series and Busch North Series also raced combination races in the past. Currently, Bristol Motor Speedway has such a race, with the Whelen Modified Tour and Whelen Southern Modified Tour.

1973 National 500
The 1973 National 500 was held October 7, 1973 at Charlotte Motor Speedway in Concord, North Carolina. The first three cars to cross the finish line after the scheduled 334 laps (501 miles) were driven by Cale Yarborough, Richard Petty, and Bobby Allison, in that order. Again, these facts are not disputed. What is disputed, is the legality of the first two cars' engines, recounted in Jim McLaurin's book ”NASCAR'S Most Wanted", in the chapter “Fudgin’ With the Rules”:

In the 1973 National 500 at Charlotte Motor Speedway, Allison protested that the engines in winner Cale Yarborough's and second-place Richard Petty's cars were over-sized. NASCAR inspected all three of the top finishers, and Allison's engine fit the cubic-displacement specs. Six hours after the inspections began, NASCAR technical director Bill Gazaway told the press that the results were being sent to headquarters in Daytona for a final decision.

Monday afternoon NASCAR released a statement saying that, because the inspection facilities at Charlotte were inadequate, the pre-race inspection numbers would be used-when all three cars were legal and that the results would stand.

Allison threatened both to quit and to sue. It was not until after a private meeting with NASCAR President Bill France Jr., a week later that Allison was assuaged. Speculation was that Allison had been bought off. Allison wouldn't confirm or deny it, saying only that he had “received satisfactory restitution”. The results were never changed. 1973 was a transition year in NASCAR. Teams could run a restrictor plate-equipped 7-liter engine or a 5.9 liter engine without restrictor plates. A decade later, Petty's over sized engine at the same race resulted in new NASCAR rules being implemented against oversized engines, including the possibility of twelve-week suspensions for the offending engine builder, driver, and car owner.

1982 Daytona 500 
Following his victory at Daytona, Allison's car was inspected and was found to have lost its rear bumper, which appeared to have fallen off in a slight bump between two cars at the beginning of the race, causing a multi-car accident. Tests were performed on the car without its rear bumper and it was discovered that the car was faster and handled better without the bumper (better underside aerodynamics and over 70lbs. lighter). It has been claimed that Allison and his crew modified the bumper so that it would fall off easily at the beginning of the race. NASCAR never fined him and the victory stands. Allison and his crew denied the allegations. In the Allison biography Miracle, Allison explained that NASCAR inspectors told the DiGard crew to move the bumper on its mounting points. The team simply tack-welded the bumper back on at an acceptable position, but "forgot" to properly secure it.

Car owner
Allison drove his own cars for portions of the early 1970s, including the full 1973 season. Allison won six races as an owner-driver from 1970 to 1974. Allison also ran for his own team in 1977 after splitting with Roger Penske, with a best finish of second at Nashville.

In 1985 Allison returned to being an owner-driver after leaving DiGard Motorsports, taking his number (22) and sponsor (Miller American) with him to his new team. His best finish as an owner-driver in 1985 was a fourth-place finish at Dover. Following the 1985 season he brought his number and sponsor with him to the Stavola Brothers Racing team.

In 1990 Allison revived his team and was a car owner for numerous drivers, most notably Mike Alexander, Hut Stricklin, Jimmy Spencer, and Derrike Cope. Stricklin was Donnie Allison's son-in-law.

The car number raced was No. 12 and sponsors included Raybestos Brakes from 1990 to 1992 and, in 1993, Meineke. Stricklin moved to the Junior Johnson & Associates team halfway through 1992 and Raybestos left at the end of the year to the Stavola Brothers No. 8 team. For 1994 season, the team partnered with Ron Zook, for Cup and Busch Series. For 1995 and 1996, the team was sponsored by Mane 'n Tail with Derrike Cope at the wheel. Allison was forced to close down the team due to financial problems after the 1996 season.

Recent years
Allison has actively promoted rail safety for the CSX "Keep on Living" campaign with appearances at Talladega and Daytona. On March 6, 2008, his mother, Kittie Allison, died at age 101 in Charlotte, North Carolina. On May 23, 2011, Bobby Allison was inducted into the NASCAR Hall of Fame.

Judy Allison, Bobby's wife of 55 years, died December 18, 2015, following complications from surgery.

Motorsports career results

NASCAR
(key) (Bold – Pole position awarded by qualifying time. Italics – Pole position earned by points standings or practice time. * – Most laps led.)

Grand National Series

Winston Cup Series

Daytona 500

Busch Series

International Race of Champions
(key) (Bold – Pole position. * – Most laps led.)

American open-wheel racing
(key) (Races in bold indicate pole position)

USAC Championship Car

Indianapolis 500

See also
List of NASCAR drivers

References

External links

 
 
 
 Bobby Allison at NASCAR.com
 
 The Greatest 33 Profile

1937 births
Living people
Racing drivers from Miami
Indianapolis 500 drivers
NASCAR drivers
NASCAR Cup Series champions
International Race of Champions drivers
Trans-Am Series drivers
American Speed Association drivers
NASCAR team owners
International Motorsports Hall of Fame inductees
People from Hueytown, Alabama
Racing drivers from Alabama
Alabama Gang
Archbishop Curley-Notre Dame High School alumni
Team Penske drivers
USAC Stock Car drivers
NASCAR Hall of Fame inductees